St Peter and St Paul's Church, Clare is a Grade I listed parish church in the Church of England in Clare, Suffolk. It is one of the largest and most beautiful in East Anglia, described as a "large and handsome church... within a spacious churchyard", and is included by Simon Jenkins in his 2009 book England's Thousand Best Churches, where he awards it three stars.

History
The church is principally of the 14th and early 15th century, with 13th-century work in the west tower, in the perpendicular style. The list of past priests extends as far back as 1307. "The tower is unfortunately a little short for the church.....all the windows of the aisles and clerestory are slender and closely set, the effect has the same erectness as Holy Trinity Church, Long Melford and St Peter and St Paul's Church, Lavenham. The remodelling of the interior made it very airy." 'Seen from any angle it floats on the skyline like a great ship, with a small tower for a fo'c'stle and two turrets for masts.....The interior is ablaze with light.'

The church possesses a late 15th-century brass lectern in the form of an eagle with three dogs as feet rather than lions; this may have served as a collection-box, money posted at the beak exiting at the tail.  There are two fine private pews, one with the emblems of Henry VIII and Catherine of Aragon, the other an ostentatious Stuart gallery pew with scroll-sided poppyheads "so like those at Little Thurlow that they may have been carved by the same man".  In the chancel there are rare Jacobean carved choir stalls. The motto above the sundial over the south porch reads: 'Go about your business', not a mercantile admonition but a peremptory version of St Paul's advice: "For we hear that there are some which walk among you disorderly, working not at all, but are busybodies". Around the doorway may be seen carved ten faces of the Green Man, a somewhat pagan image to be seen on a church, but widely used across Christian Europe.

The greatest disaster to befall the church was the visit of William Dowsing in 1643. The Puritan Parliament decreed the demolition of altars, removal of candlesticks, and defacement of pictures and images. 'Basher' Dowsing, a fanatical anti-Romanist, was appointed as 'Parliamentary Visitor for the East Anglian counties for demolishing the superstitious pictures and ornaments of churches'.  'Cromwell's iconoclast' kept a journal of his visits.  On 6 January 1644, he visited six churches, including Haverhill.  As for Clare, he wrote: "We brake down 1000 pictures superstitious: I brake down 200; 3 of God the Father, and 3 of Christ, and of the Holy Lamb, and 3 of the Holy Ghost like a Dove with Wings; and the Twelve Apostles were carved in wood, on top of the Roof, which we gave order to take down; and 20 Cherubim to be taken down; and the Sun and the Moon in the East window, by the King's Arms to be taken down".  Bullet holes in the roof suggest one inaccurate method; the rest being done with arrows, stones, poles and whitewash.  The Sun and Moon still survive.

Like most English churches, it was altered in the Victorian era. It was first 'repaired and beautified' in 1834–36, and a gallery was also added. In 1876 a plan was given by the architect James Piers St Aubyn for work done between 1877 and 1883. In 1898, Detmar Blow, architect for the Society for the Protection of Ancient Buildings, was brought in to repair the tower.

Administration
The Parish of Clare with Poslingford also includes St Mary's Church, Poslingford, now a chapel of ease. It is part of the Stour Valley Benefice, along with the parishes of: 
 St Mary the Virgin's Church, Cavendish
 St John the Baptist's Church, Stoke-by-Clare
 St Leonard's Church, Wixoe
 All Saints Church, Hundon

Organ

In the eighteenth century an organ stood at the west end of the church, but this was moved to the current position in 1864. A new organ was obtained in 1888, originally built in 1847 by Gray and Davison for St John the Evangelist's Church, Regent's Park, London.

In 1977 a replacement was acquired from St Peter's Church, Ipswich as a memorial to Clare Wayman (1892-1976). A specification of the organ can be found on the National Pipe Organ Register.

Bells
The church has a ring of eight bells, noted as having heaviest tenor of any ring of eight bells in Suffolk weighing 28cwt.

The 7th bell is unusually inscribed Trintas Sancta Campanum Istam Conserva ("Holy Trinity conserve this bell") and was likely cast around 1410. The sixth bell dates from 1579, and is by John Dier. At 15cwt and 43 inches in diameter it is largest example of Dier's work to survive.

In 1781 the ring was increased by from six to eight when William Mears cast two additional bells. The third and fifth are by the Miles Graye family of Colchester. The tenor of 28 cwt was recast in 1893 by Charles Newman of Norwich, and the fourth was recast in London by William Mears.

The gotch

An unusual item in the church is the gotch, a beer jug presented to the bell ringers in 1729 by the vicar, Matthew Bell. It has a pun in its inscription campana sonant canore ("the bells ring in harmony"). The bell and crown, embossed upon it, are a reference to the Crown Hotel which was owned by the family of the vicar.

The church today
The church is open for visitors every day. The Friends of Clare Church holds regular fund raising and social events to support the church. The Society for Music in Clare Church organises concerts throughout the year. There is an active branch of the Mothers' Union and a Flower Guild.

The choir sings at every principal Sunday service. The church has a well-stocked shop and bookstall. Parking is available around the church in Clare and the nearest car park is at Clare Country Park, about five minutes away up a moderate incline.

Incumbents

John De Stebbing 1307
Richard de Scordich 1329
Gilbert de Karliolo 1343
John de Houghton 1344
John Joye 1348
Nicholas de Lydgate 1350
Thomas Porter 1361
Richard Clerk 1388
William Hall 1390
Walter Cove 1394
William Reed 1398
Thomas Custen 1404
Richard Pumpy alias Tylney 1432
Thomas asty 1462
John Motton
John Knight 1467
William Wellys MA 1468
Robert Colingham
John Wyllys 1476
Reginald Annyson 1477
Thomas Sutton DR 1482
John Halyman 1502
Richard Turner MA 1505
John Reiston 1516
John Metton 
Robert Parker 1562
Thomas Rogers 1565
Nicholas Whitfilde 1566
Francis Watsonne 
Radulph Leyver BA 1569
Robert Ballard BA 1582
James Resould 1591
William Colt MA 1598
Daniel Booth MA 1617
Isaac Joyner MA 1617
Robert Wilmot MA 1623
William Good MA 1627
Roger Cook MA 1645
William Prime
John Ockley MA 1663
John Kenyon 1690
Oliver Cobb MA 1703
Matthew Bell BA 1727
John Bell BA 1750
William Lens 1784
Abraham Wallett 1785
William Brook Jones BA 1791
William Sadler MA 1804
Henry Blunt BA 1819
George Wightman DD 1833
John C. Coleman 1854
Thomas Parkinson 1869
Frederick S.P. Seale BA 1871
Joseph W. Collins 1876
Robert Sorsbie MA 1882
James R.M. Vatcher MA 1896
Francis S. Swithinbank BA. 1931
Richard L Hordern MA 1962
John D. Beloe MA 1969
Ralph Thicknesse MA 1974
Maurice G. Woodward MA 1977
David J. Wardrop ALCD 1986
W. John A Rankin MA 1993
Stuart Mitchell 2011
Mark Woodrow CTh (Oxon), 2021

References

External links

 St Peter and St Paul, Clare at suffolkchurches.co.uk.
 Church Website .
 Benefice Website  including all the Parishes mentioned.

Church of England church buildings in Suffolk
Grade I listed churches in Suffolk
Clare, Suffolk